Alfred Paul Rogers (July 5, 1873 – April 6, 1959) was an American orthodontist who was considered the father of the myofunctional therapy in orthodontics. He was the president of American Association of Orthodontists and American Academy of Dental Sciences. He was also instrumental in forming the American Board of Orthodontics.

Life
He was born in Amherst, Nova Scotia, in 1873.  He was the youngest of 11 children of William Henry Rogers and Mary E. Rogers. He attended Horton Collegiate Academy for high school and Acadia University for undergraduate studies. He then went to University of Toronto's Royal College of Dental Surgeons of Ontario and Pennsylvania College of Dental Surgery, where he obtained his dental degree in 1896. He then attended Angle School of Orthodontia in 1903.

He started his own practice of dentistry in 1896 before he attended the Angle School of Orthodontia. He moved to Boston in 1906 and he was the first person to exclusively practice orthodontics in New England.

Work
Alfred always had a deep interest in teaching and therefore he taught at Harvard School of Dental Medicine from 1918 to 1945. He was the associate professor of orthodontic research along with director of Harvard-Forsyth Postgraduate School of Orthodontics.

Alfred was greatly influenced by the work of pediatricians with children. He was impressed by the benefits from the early supervised exercises done in the treatment of children. He started exploring the effect of musculature of oral cavity on the structure of mouth. Alfred devised a system of exercises that stimulated growth in the maxillofacial region. He eventually called this therapy "myofunctional therapy in orthodontics". In 1918, at the annual meeting of American Association of Orthodontists, he presented his first paper that talked about effects of musculature on mouth. He published his last paper in 1950 which was titled "A Restatement of the Myofunctional Concept in Orthodontics".

He received honorary degrees from Acadia University (1944), and Washington University (1941). Rogers resided with his wife in their home in New Hampshire after retirement. He was a Certified Tree Farmer and a charter member of the American Tree Farm Association. The forest around his house was eventually named Alfred Paul Rogers Forest, as a living memorial for Alfred. His love for nature was displayed by many essays written by him. One of the essays named "Notes of a Countryman" was published in a book form in 1938 by Bruce Humphries.

He had two sons with his second wife, Georgina Crosby: Robert Page Rogers and Edward Saunders Rogers. Robert was a pediatrician in Greenwich, Connecticut, and Edwards was a professor of public health at the University of California. He married a third time to H. Evanel Haines in 1957.

Awards and positions
 America Academy of Dental Science – president
 American Association of Orthodontists – president
 Northeastern Society of Orthodontists – president 
 Albert H. Ketcham Memorial Award – 1938

References

1873 births
Orthodontists
1959 deaths
Acadia University alumni
University of Toronto alumni
Canadian emigrants to the United States